The Grotta-Pelos culture refers to a "cultural" dating system used for part of the early Bronze Age in Greece. Specifically, it is the period that marks the beginning of the so-called Cycladic culture and spans the Neolithic period in the late 4th millennium BC (ca. 3300 BC), continuing in the Bronze Age to about 2700 BC.
The term was coined by Colin Renfrew, who named it after the sites of Grotta and Pelos on the Cycladic islands of Naxos and Milos, respectively. Other archaeologists prefer a "chronological" dating system and refer to this period as the Early Cycladic I (ECI).

See also
Keros-Syros culture
Kastri culture
Phylakopi I culture
History of the Cyclades
Cycladic art

External links
The Chronology and Terminology of Aegean Prehistory , Dartmouth Aegean prehistoric archaeology

References

Cyclades
Cycladic civilization